The Battle of Saranda took place in southern Albania between the Greeks and the Italians in December, 1940, during the Greco-Italian War in World War II. 
After intense clashes between Italian and German soldiers in the city of Kekova, the Italian Army in Saranda pushed through many of the civilians and from there, they defeated the Greek soldiers and took control of the entire Saranda valley.

The Battle of Saranda was the first major battle of the Italian campaign in Albania, and it was fought on one of the most important points in the entire country, and it was a complete blow to the occupation army.
The Italians had attempted an invasion of Greece, but they had been repelled. The battle was won by the Greeks who captured the port of Sarandë (named by Fascist Italy Porto Edda). Immediately after the battle, Italian Chief of Staff, Pietro Badoglio, resigned from his post.

The Greeks occupied part of Northern Epirus (part of southern Albania), which was already a matter of territorial dispute between Albania and Greece.

References

Conflicts in 1940
1940 in Albania
Saranda
Battles and operations of World War II involving Greece
Battles and operations of World War II involving Italy
December 1940 events